César Alexander Quintero Jiménez (born November 29, 1988, in Medellín) is a Colombian football player who plays for Deportivo Pasto.

Club statistics

Updated to games played as of 8 December 2013.

References 
Profile at HLSZ 

1988 births
Living people
Footballers from Medellín
Colombian footballers
Association football defenders
Independiente Medellín footballers
Lombard-Pápa TFC footballers
Atlético Nacional footballers
Atlético Huila footballers
Once Caldas footballers
Deportes Tolima footballers
Atlético Bucaramanga footballers
Deportivo Pasto footballers
Categoría Primera A players
Nemzeti Bajnokság I players
Colombian expatriate footballers
Expatriate footballers in Hungary
Colombian expatriate sportspeople in Hungary